is a fictional character and the main heroine in Key's adult visual novel Kanon, followed closely by Nayuki Minase who is the only Kanon heroine to appear with Ayu on three of the official game covers released by Key. Ayu was created by Naoki Hisaya who wrote her scenario for the visual novel, and designed by Itaru Hinoue. Hisaya commented on how he thought Ayu was the one character in Kanon that he felt he grasped the best, but noted it was very difficult to write her character due to Ayu being primarily energetic. After Hinoue drew wings on Ayu's backpack, Hisaya suggested that they remove them due to spoiler reasons, and while Hinoue went along with it at the time, the wings were later included once again.

Yuichi Aizawa, the protagonist of Kanon, meets a lively seventeen-year-old Ayu on the day after he moves to the city depicted in the game. As the story progresses, Yuichi discovers that she is trying to find something she lost, but she cannot remember what it is; Yuichi tries to help her in her search, but with no initial success. One of her most defining characteristics is the repeated utterance of her catch phrase  which she mutters as an expression of various negative emotions such as frustration, anger, and fear. Her favorite food is taiyaki, and she is seen eating the confection many times throughout Kanon.

The main focus of both Kanon anime is Ayu, who has also appeared in all of Kanons adaptations, and has been incorporated into numerous dōjin games. Ayu makes a cameo appearance in the second episode of the Air anime series along with Nayuki, and Makoto Sawatari from Kanon. Her voice actresses are Yui Horie in the Japanese versions of the visual novel and anime, and Brittney Karbowski in the English version of Kyoto Animation's Kanon anime, who also voiced Ayu during her cameo in Air. A leitmotif named  is associated with Ayu which is played in Kanon numerous times during scenes which involve her, and is also used in a similar fashion throughout Kyoto Animation's Kanon anime. In a review by Anime News Network, Ayu is described as a character that "persists on a degree of earnest cuteness that will endear her to some viewers."

Creation and conception

Naoki Hisaya, who wrote Ayu's story, commented in an interview that the night before he was to present the beginning of a Kanon scenario, he suddenly remembered wanting to write for some time about a ghost girl who waits for the protagonist to come back to her. He said that he wanted to write this no matter what and quickly drew up an outline for the premise of Ayu's scenario. At the time, Ayu's premise was the start of the entire Kanon story, though it was still very vague. Eventually, Hisaya was able to form her story into the style of a romance visual novel, and in the process the characters in the story started to multiply. Hisaya said that Ayu was the one character in Kanon that he felt he grasped the best, but noted it was very difficult to write her character due to Ayu being primarily energetic. Hisaya said that he is much better at writing about quiet characters, so Ayu gave him a lot of trouble. Hisaya noted that Ayu's frequent use of "ugū" was not decided from the beginning, and that it merely turned out that way during the natural writing process.

Ayu's character designer, Itaru Hinoue, commented in an interview that she put a lot of effort into Ayu's design, and Ayu was her favorite character to create among the Kanon characters. Hinoue was able to design Ayu any way she wanted, and by all means she wanted Ayu to wear her large tan duffle coat, and be depicted as a strong character. Hinoue said that she was very particular about Ayu's attire, but not about everything. At the time she was formulating the character design, many festivals were going on in Osaka, Japan where Key is located. When Hinoue had a chance to attend, there were many people around wearing angel wings as part of the festival, and because she thought they looked cute, she later chose to draw them onto Ayu as well. Hinoue later read Ayu's finished scenario and became aware of an unintentional form of foreshadowing on her part due to wing imagery factoring into Ayu's story. Shortly after, Hisaya suggested to Hinoue, "Since they seem to have become a spoiler, let's lose the wings." The wings were thus removed, but before long they were attached again. While Hinoue had originally chosen the colors for the hair and eyes of the characters herself, these were later discussed by the development team and altered accordingly, though Ayu, Mai, and Nayuki did not change much. It came to the point where Hinoue had to constantly go back and forth between her intentions and what was later decided by consensus.

Characteristics
Ayu is a strange and mysterious seventeen-year-old girl, the same age as Yuichi, though due to her short stature at 154 cm (5'1") and comparatively low body weight at 41 kg (90 lbs), she is perceived initially by Yuichi to be much younger; in fact, Ayu is the shortest and least heavy character introduced in Kanon. Ayu's three sizes are 80 cm - 52 cm - 79 cm (31" - 20" - 31"), and are the closest to Shiori's despite Shiori being one year younger. When first introduced, Ayu is seen wearing a large tan duffle coat over a sweater and shorts, despite the cold winter weather, and is the only Kanon character seen to regularly don mittens. On her feet, she wears brown argyle socks and snow boots. She is immediately recognizable by the red Alice band in her short brown hair, and a small backpack she wears which has two attached wings on either side. In later appearances, she is sometimes seen without her coat or mittens. As a child of ten, Ayu is depicted wearing a pink sweater, a short skirt, and a large white bow in her hair, which is grown-out slightly longer than when Ayu is seventeen.

Since childhood, Ayu has referred to herself with the masculine pronoun —Japanese for "I", a rare occurrence among females. Ayu is notorious for her catch phrase, which she mutters as an expression of various negative emotions such as frustration, anger, and fear. Her favorite food is taiyaki, and she is seen eating the confection many times throughout Kanon. Ayu comes off as somewhat strange, such as initially tackling Yuichi and yelling his name whenever she would spot him. These tackling fits eventually diminish in severity to simple taps on the back as time goes on or even simply calling out his name when appearing seemingly out of nowhere behind him. She can be clumsy at times, and is prone to tripping. Ayu tends to be naïve about common things, such as not knowing what a mobile phone is, but enjoys learning about new things. Yuichi quickly discovers how terrified Ayu will become at even the mere mention of ghosts or demons. When put into an uncomfortable situation, such as having to walk alone at night, she is noticeably jumpy and is prone to screaming.

Appearances

Visual novel
Ayu Tsukimiya is introduced as girl running from a taiyaki salesmen when she collides with Yuichi Aizawa, the protagonist of Kanon, in the shopping district. Yuichi and Ayu become fast friends after she meets him several more times in the shopping district, and Ayu helps him remember that they first met and became friends during Yuichi's last stay in the city seven years previous. A focus in Ayu's storyline is that she is constantly searching for something she has lost, but she does not even remember what it is, which troubles her greatly. Yuichi plays an active role in helping her try to find the item with no initial success. Shortly after Yuichi and Ayu become involved in an intimate relationship, Ayu remembers what happened in the past and disappears without a trace.

Seven years before the onset of the story, Yuichi first met Ayu in almost exactly the same place as where they collided at the beginning of Kanon. Ayu was crying at the time due to the recent death of her mother, and in an effort to make her feel better, Yuichi bought her taiyaki, which in turn became her favorite food. They met up several more times over the winter school break, and one day Yuichi obtained a small angel doll from a claw vending machine and gave it to Ayu. Yuichi stipulated that he would grant any three wishes she wished on the doll within his limited power. Her first wish was for Yuichi to never forget her. Yuichi took Ayu into the nearby forest to a clearing with a large tree in its center. There, Ayu made her second wish that they could go to school together. Due to this, they decided to make this tree their own private "school" with special stipulations such as no homework or tests, and taiyaki is served for lunch every day. Afterwards, Ayu decided to bury the doll in a jar near the forest. On the last day of winter break, while Yuichi and Ayu were attending their "school", Ayu was sitting up in the tree when a strong gust of wind came and knocked her out of it, causing her to land on her head and fall unconscious. This accident is what caused the young Yuichi to suppress his memories of his childhood.

After Yuichi remembers what happened in the past, he assumes Ayu died, which causes him to become depressed. During this time, Yuichi remembers the doll that Ayu buried, and gathers his friends to go find it. Once he finds and repairs it, he goes to the now cut-down tree in the forest clearing until Ayu appears again. They have a tearful reunion where Yuichi reminds her of the angel doll, and that she still has one more wish left. Ayu suggests that she might wish for Yuichi to not remember her at all, and move on. After they embrace, Ayu simply vanishes again. Yuichi later discovers that Ayu did not die, and had been in the hospital for seven years in a coma, making her an ikiryō. Ayu miraculously wakes up from her coma and the two are shown out in town about to go back to Yuichi's house.

Other Kanon media
Ayu has appeared in other media adaptations based on the Kanon visual novel which includes light novels, drama CDs, manga, and anime. Of the five light novels written for Kanon, Ayu is the main focus of the final installment entitled . Two of the fifteen drama CDs released had Ayu as a main focus, and Ayu appears in the five anthology drama CDs. In the first official Kanon manga, Ayu's story is made the main focus, and her story is the only one of the five heroines to go into detail and reveal the latter portions of her story. Conversely, in the second manga version, Ayu is only the main focus of the final chapter, but is given the second highest number of pages in the manga behind Nayuki. Ayu has also appeared in Kanons numerous manga anthologies.

In 2002, Toei Animation produced the first Kanon anime and featured character design by Yōichi Ōnishi who based the designs on Itaru Hinoue's original concept. In 2006, Kyoto Animation produced a new rendition of the Kanon anime with updated visuals and a more detailed story; character design was headed by Kazumi Ikeda who also worked off of Hinoue's original artwork from the visual novel. In both anime, Ayu is given the focus as the main heroine, and Yuichi ends up falling in love with her in both versions as well.

Outside Kanon

Ayu has appeared in many works outside Kanon, as well as being cited as being extremely popular and recognized in both Japan and the west. Ayu especially "has had more appearances outside the original Kanon than any other anime or H-game character ever." Ayu has appeared in countless dōjin games such as Glove on Fight and Eternal Fighter Zero. In the anime adaptation of Air, another of Key's visual novels, Ayu makes a cameo appearance in episode two along with Nayuki Minase and Makoto Sawatari as regular girls who talk with Yukito Kunisaki briefly.

As reported in the Kanon Visual Fan Book for the visual novel, Key had once planned to release a social simulation game with the tentative title  featuring Ayu, as she appears at ten years old, as the game's sole heroine. The game was expected to be released on June 30, 2000, though Key never mentioned the game again. Other games announced at the time which involved Ayu as the main focus were an action game named , a role-playing video game called , and a quiz game entitled .

Musical theme

A leitmotif named  is associated with Ayu and is played in Kanon numerous times during scenes which involve her; it is also used in a similar fashion throughout Kyoto Animation's Kanon anime adaptation. It is first heard during Ayu's first appearance in both the visual novel and the aforementioned anime version. The theme is composed by Shinji Orito, one of Key's signature composers, and is the longest of Kanon'''s five leitmotifs on the Kanon Original Soundtrack at 3:04 minutes. A remix version by Magome Togoshi appeared on the Kanon soundtracks Anemoscope and Recollections. "Hidamari no Machi" was composed in common time in the E-flat major key, and moves at 126 beats per minute. The theme was composed on a synthesizer which primarily used a piano as a base, along with violin, vibraphone, and percussion accompaniment throughout the piece. Orito commented on the song in the Kanon Original Soundtrack booklet where he remarked, "This is probably the song I like most out of all the theme songs...I think the percussion is really good."Untranslated quote: 

Cultural impactMegatokyo, a webcomic that takes much of its inspiration from Kanon, references Ayu. First, in strip 67 "Saving Points", Ayu is shown eating taiyaki. This is, in fact, a reference to a Kanon dōjinshi called Quarter Iceshop, as stated by Megatokyos artist Fred Gallagher in his commentary during the publication of volume one of his webcomic, as well as the "rants" accompanying the strip itself. Also, in strip 224 "packing away", Gallagher draws himself wearing Ayu's backpack and mentioning her catchphrase "ugū", as well as stating that the backpack was the "official winged backpack from Kanon."

Ayu has been parodied in several anime. Episode eight of Magical Shopping Arcade Abenobashi parodies Kanon and other adult games. In it, Ayu's Japanese voice actress Yui Horie plays a girl that is modeled after Ayu, and references taiyaki and "ugū" near the end. In episode four of Lucky Star, Konata gives a tardy excuse to her teacher Nanako, stating that she was late because there was a girl running away from a taiyaki seller; after listening to the excuse, Nanako utters "ugū" out of frustration. Another parody in Lucky Star is that when Kagami scolds Konata in episode 13 when she complains about her winter break being occupied by homework, Ayu's backpack appears behind Konata, and she utters "ugū". In Mission-E, a character greatly inspired by Ayu appears on a manga cover near the middle of episode 11. In My Bride Is a Mermaid, Sun eats a taiyaki and says "ugū" in episode two, and Gōzaburō crushes a taiyaki and says "ugū" in episode 20.

In a review by Anime News Network of the first anime DVD volume of Kyoto Animation's Kanon anime, Ayu is described as a character that "persists on a degree of earnest cuteness that will endear her to some viewers." In the same review, Ayu's winged backpack is cited as possibly being a "little overkill" in regards to the moe attributes of the series. Newtype USA stated in an article on Kanon that, "Ayu beams brightly with joy as she munches on her favorite fish-shaped crepe, looking so adorable you almost wanna pinch her." G. B. Smith from The Fandom Post noted how Tsukimiya stands out within the cast of sad children due to her cheerful personality. The writer also emphasized the emotional strength of Tsukimiya's story arc and her relationship with the main character. Stig Høgset from THEM Anime Reviews noted that while some character elements of Ayu might give the viewer "some hurdles to overcome," the entire cast remained appealing in the 2006 anime series. John Sinnott from DVD Talk simply referred to her as "the typical 'cute kid' who even has a silly word she says whenever she's angry or upset ('Ugu')." Todd Douglass Jr. from the same website said that while her introduction might be predictable based on harem series, he found that the cast became interesting. Active Anime writer Holly Ellingwood referred to her as "cute and rather enigmatic" and hoped Yuichi could remember the apparent bond they used to share. In the Newtype "Top 100 Anime Heroines" from 2003, Ayu ranked 23rd.

Merchandise
Four figurines of Ayu were produced by different manufacturers in 2007. The earliest was released on January 29 by Movic which also came with a chibi version of Ayu dressed in a Santa Claus outfit. The next was released on July 2 by Russian Blue, and the third followed a month later on August 6 by Kotobukiya which was in fact a reproduction of a model previously released. The fourth figurine was released on October 19 by Max Factory, and was the most expensive of the four. An official "ugū" audio CD was coupled with the 127-page Kanon Visual Memories art book for Kyoto Animation's Kanon'' anime adaptation released on June 24, 2007 by Ichijinsha. The CD contains eighty-six variations of Ayu's iconic catch phrase featured in the anime, and is voiced by Yui Horie. The CD spans ten minutes, though most of the duration is silent due to each "ugū" lasting less than two seconds on each track, resulting in about one-third of the CD as rendered blank.

References

External links
Official Kanon visual novel character profiles 

Female characters in anime and manga
Female characters in video games
Fictional Japanese people in video games
Teenage characters in video games
Kanon (video game)
Video game characters introduced in 1999